Fredo is a masculine given name, and diminutive of Alfredo or Federico, which may refer to:

People
 Getúlio Fredo (born 1954), Brazilian football manager
 Fredo Santana (1990–2018), stage name of American rapper Derrick Coleman (born 1990)
 Fredo Viola, American singer-songwriter and multi-media artist
 Fredo (rapper) (born 1994), London-based rapper

Fictional characters
 Fredo Corleone, in the Godfather films and novels
 Fredo Legaspi, a main character in the Filipino TV series Dyesebel (2008 TV series)
 Alfredo "Fredo" Montilla, a protagonist in the Filipino TV series Dyesebel (2014 TV series)
 Fredo, the title character of Fantastic Man, a 2007 Filipino TV series
 Fredo Gupta, a character in Harvey Girls Forever!

See also
 Frei, Norway, a former municipality whose name was written Fredø until 1889
 Freddo, a chocolate bar shaped like a frog

Italian masculine given names